AGIC may refer to:
Adarsh Gramin Inter College, Chandok, Uttar Pradesh, India
Arizona Geographic Information Council